Temple Ohabei Shalom is a significant Reform synagogue in Brookline, Massachusetts under the spiritual leadership of Rabbi Audrey Berkman, Assistant Rabbi Jennifer Queen, and Rabbi Emerita, Emily Gopen Lipof.

Organized in 1842 with membership mainly of German origin, it is the oldest Jewish congregation in Massachusetts and the third oldest in New England, following congregations in Newport and New Haven.   the congregation's first act was to establish a cemetery, the Temple Ohabei Shalom Cemetery. A registered historic site located in East Boston, Massachusetts. The cemetery will soon be the home of the Jewish Cemetery Association of Massachusetts' museum commemorating the Mystic River Jews (Boston, Chelsea, Revere, Malden, Everett, and north).

The first synagogue building, erected in 1851 on Warren Street, Boston, was a handsome, two-story wooden structure with a doorway flanked by a pair of windows on each side and balanced by three pairs of windows on the second floor. The windows, each set a pair with arched tops, resembled the standard representation of the tablets of the ten commandments. The sanctuary could seat 400 and had space for a Hebrew School, a meeting room, and a mikveh.

The congregation's second building, used from 1863–86, was a handsome Greek Revival structure at 76 Warrenton Street, Boston. It had been built as a Universalist church and is today the home of the Charles Playhouse.

The third building was the former home of the Unitarian Church led by Edward Everett Hale, who spoke at the building's rededication as a synagogue in 1887.  The building is now the home of a Greek Orthodox church.

The congregation's present building, an opulent structure at 1187 Beacon Street in suburban Brookline that combined Byzantine Revival  and Moorish Revival styles, was dedicated in 1925. The sanctuary seats 1,800. The smaller chapel accommodates 300. The domed building was intended to have a tall minaret, according to the architect's renditions, although it was never built.  The sanctuary was modeled on Hagia Sophia because of the excitement then felt over recent excavations of Byzantine-era synagogues in the land of  Israel.  The building includes a large school, an auditorium, a ballroom (that could be used as a gymnasium), a museum, a library, and a reading room.

Temple Israel was founded in 1854 when German Jews who disliked the influx of Polish Jews seceded from Ohabei Shalom. The congregations remain friendly and are working together on several projects related to outreach and the enhancement of the local Jewish community.

The Temple community celebrates its 180th Anniversary this year in 2022.

Temple Ohabei Shalom is also home to the Diane K. Trust Center For Early Education and Ansin Religious School.

Webpage
 Temple Ohabei Shalom website

References

External links
 SAH Archipedia Building Entry

German-American culture in Massachusetts
Polish-American culture in Massachusetts
Reform synagogues in Massachusetts
Buildings and structures in Brookline, Massachusetts
Synagogues completed in 1925
Moorish Revival synagogues
Byzantine Revival architecture in Massachusetts
Moorish Revival architecture in Massachusetts
Greek Revival architecture in Massachusetts
Tourist attractions in Brookline, Massachusetts